Malé is a comune (municipality) in Trentino in the northern Italian region Trentino-Alto Adige/Südtirol, located about  northwest of the provincial capital Trento.

The municipality of Malé contains the frazioni (subdivisions, mainly villages and hamlets) Magras, Arnago, Bolentina, Montes, Pondasio and Molini.

Malé borders the following municipalities: Rabbi, Terzolas, Croviana and Dimaro Folgarida.

The economy of Malé is based mainly on tourism, handcraft (typically wooden products), and farming (typically producing apples, cheese and cooked meats). The Trento-Malè-Marilleva railway connects the comune to Trento.

Near Malè is the Stelvio National Park, one of the biggest natural National Parks in Italy, and the Brenta group a UNESCO World heritage site.

From 15 to 22 June 2008 Malè was the venue of the mountain bike trials competitions of the UCI Mountain Bike & Trials World Championships "Val di Sole 2008". The sections were set up (for the first time in history) in the town squares.

Demographic evolution

References

External links
 Official website of the municipality 

Cities and towns in Trentino-Alto Adige/Südtirol